Cyperus blakeanus is a sedge of the family Cyperaceae that is native to Australia.

The plant blooms between April and May producing green-brown flowers.

In Western Australia it is found in the Kimberley, Pilbara, Goldfields-Esperance regions where it grows in red sandy-loamy soils.

It was first described in 1991 by Karen Wilson, with the species epithet, blakeanus, honouring Stanley Thatcher Blake"who contributed so greatly to the taxonomic understanding of Australasian Cyperaceae".

See also
List of Cyperus species

References

Plants described in 1991
Flora of Western Australia
blakeanus
Taxa named by Karen Louise Wilson